Anna Maria Toso is an Italian former paralympic athlete who won 20 medals (eight gold) in four different sports at the Summer Paralympics.

Achievements

See also
Italy at the 1960 Summer Paralympics
List of multiple Paralympic gold medalists at a single Games
Italy at the Paralympics - Multiple medallists

References

External links
 

Date of birth missing
Date of death missing
Place of birth missing
Place of death missing
Paralympic athletes of Italy
Paralympic wheelchair fencers of Italy
Paralympic swimmers of Italy
Paralympic table tennis players of Italy
Italian female javelin throwers
Italian female discus throwers
Italian female shot putters
Italian female freestyle swimmers
Italian female fencers
Athletes (track and field) at the 1960 Summer Paralympics
Athletes (track and field) at the 1964 Summer Paralympics
Swimmers at the 1960 Summer Paralympics
Swimmers at the 1964 Summer Paralympics
Wheelchair fencers at the 1960 Summer Paralympics
Wheelchair fencers at the 1964 Summer Paralympics
Paralympic gold medalists for Italy
Paralympic silver medalists for Italy
Paralympic bronze medalists for Italy
Medalists at the 1960 Summer Paralympics
Medalists at the 1964 Summer Paralympics
Paralympic medalists in athletics (track and field)
Paralympic medalists in swimming
Paralympic medalists in table tennis
Paralympic medalists in wheelchair fencing
Sportspeople from Veneto
Wheelchair javelin throwers
Wheelchair discus throwers
Wheelchair shot putters
Paralympic javelin throwers
Paralympic shot putters
Paralympic discus throwers
Italian female breaststroke swimmers
Italian female backstroke swimmers